The Beach Boys Love You is the 21st studio album by American rock band the Beach Boys, released April 11, 1977 on Brother/Reprise. Sometimes referred to as the band's "punk" or "synth pop" album, Love You is distinguished for its pioneering use of synthesizers and its juxtaposition of adolescent-oriented lyrics with the adult band members' rough vocals.

The album was largely recorded in late 1976 at the band's Brother Studios. Originally planned as Brian Loves You, it is essentially a solo project by Brian Wilson, who wrote almost all of the material and played nearly every instrument on the record, including keyboards, synthesizers, and drums. Love You marked the first time he was given full control of a Beach Boys album since the Smile sessions in 1967, albeit with strong assistance from his brothers Carl and Dennis.

Engineer Earle Mankey described the work as "serious", "autobiographical", and "frighteningly accurate" to Brian's personality. The subject matter of the 14 songs ranges from the planetary system and roller skating to adolescent sexuality and babies. Wilson also included tributes to his wife, daughters, and mistress, as well as his idols Phil Spector and Johnny Carson. Although it was met with near-unanimous critical acclaim, some listeners found the album's bizarre, childlike quality to be a detriment. The record sold poorly, peaking at number 53 on the U.S. Billboard Top LPs & Tape chart. 

Love You has since been recognized for contributions to synth-pop and new wave. A follow-up, Adult/Child, was completed by the group, but left unreleased. Wilson later referred to Love You as his life-defining work, and his most creatively fulfilling since Pet Sounds (1966). It was the last album he wrote and produced until his first solo LP, Brian Wilson (1988), and his last that was created without significant interference from outsiders.

Background

Following a period of semi-inactivity, in late 1975, Wilson became a patient under psychologist Eugene Landy's radical 24-hour therapy program.  Under Landy's care, he became more stable and socially engaged, with his productivity increasing once again. During the latter half of 1976, Wilson became a regular member of the band's touring line-up for the first time since 1964. The tagline "Brian's Back!" became a major promotional tool for the group's concert tours, as well as their July release 15 Big Ones, the first Beach Boys LP that reached the U.S. top 10 with new material since Pet Sounds (1966), and their first that credited Wilson as the sole producer since Pet Sounds.

15 Big Ones, which consisted of an equal share of cover songs and originals, came as a disappointment for most fans and the group members themselves. In a contemporary interview, Wilson acknowledged that the album was "nothing too deep", but promised that the band's next release would be "a masterpiece" on par with "Good Vibrations" (1966). It was to be the second-to-last album owed to their record company, Warner Bros., as their contract had been set to expire in July 1977.

From July to August 1976, Wilson joined his bandmates on a U.S. tour, after which he produced a large collection of studio recordings, largely by himself while the other Beach Boys were preoccupied with their own personal and creative affairs. During this period, in late 1976, Dennis Wilson recorded his first solo album Pacific Ocean Blue (1977), Carl Wilson produced Ricci Martin's Beached (1977), Mike Love taught Transcendental Meditation, and Al Jardine spent time with his family.

Asked in a December 1976 interview about his feelings on a solo career, Brian responded that he would like to release a solo album, however, he did not want to deal with the inner-band politics that would result from him becoming a solo artist. "They want to keep the material for the Beach Boys, too; a solo album would take away from Beach Boys sales. It would split the group up too much – and I don't think that would be good." Later in the interview, he remarked that he had recently left the band temporarily, "because I want freedom and I want to do my own album.... So I've got to make a decision: either I'm going to stay with the Beach Boys and produce only their stuff or I'm going to go on my own and do an album by myself. I haven't decided which to do yet."

Production

Love You was largely recorded in October and November 1976 at the band's Brother Studios in Santa Monica, California. Demo recordings, in which Brian previewed his new songs for his bandmates, were captured at a Brother Studios session in fall 1976. The demoed songs were "Airplane", "I'll Bet He's Nice", "It's Over Now", "Let's Put Our Hearts Together”, "Love Is a Woman", "Little Children”, "Mona", and "Still I Dream Of It.” In 2021, five of these demo recordings were officially released as downloadables on Wilson's official website.

The Love You sessions marked the first time that Brian was given full reign on a new Beach Boys album since the Smile sessions in 1967. He wrote almost the entire album and performed nearly every instrument, including keyboards, synthesizers, and drums. Carl and Dennis contributed some instrumentation, while Jardine and Love were rarely present for the sessions, and ultimately every member of the band sang several lead vocals. In biographer Peter Ames Carlin's estimation, "it was essentially [Brian's] solo album", while biographer Christian Matijas-Mecca concurred that it was effectively "a Brian Wilson solo album with only brief contributions by other members of the band who added their parts after the bulk of the work was finished." Conversely, Jardine said, "In a way, [Love You] was Carl's tribute to Brian.... Carl wanted Brian to feel appreciated. He had the most to do with that album, him and Dennis, paying tribute to their brother." Biographer Jon Stebbins similarly viewed it as "pretty much a Wilson brothers album", adding that "it's clear that Dennis and Carl willingly checked their egos to help Brian get this one out."

Contrasting his earlier records, which used orchestras of organic instruments, electronic sounds pervade Love You, with Brian more reliant on the Moog synthesizer than he had been on 15 Big Ones. All of the bass lines were performed by him on ARP and Moog synthesizers. Biographer Mark Dillon attributed the record's "oddball sound" directly to Wilson's use of these instruments. Jardine acknowledged, "The Minimoogs are all over the place." Wilson said his use of synthesizers was partly influenced by Wendy Carlos' Switched-On Bach (1969). Like on 15 Big Ones, Dennis' and Brian's vocals appeared rough and strained. Carlin describes Brian's singing style on Love You as a "gravelly, messed-up baritone and often slightly off-key. .. in some ways it almost feels like a suicidal gesture."

Brother staff engineer Earle Mankey, who had also worked on 15 Big Ones, recalled that Wilson appeared to exert more self-discipline during the Love You sessions, working typically from 10 or 11 A.M. to the early afternoon. He said that, unlike prior occasions, Wilson took the initiative to record in the studio "instead of being forced into it." Carl was credited on the Love You liner notes as "mixdown producer". According to Mankey, "Carl took his productions seriously and did really careful mixes.  When Brian came in, he'd say, 'Let's mix this,' and after one pass, like five minutes later, he'd say, 'That's good!' Or maybe he'd say, 'More bass! More vocal!' But that was it."

Over the next month, Wilson set to work on another album, Adult/Child, that was completed but left unreleased.

Themes

The first side of the album consists of uptempo songs, with the other side contains song that reflect a more adult perspective. The lyrical content ranged from Wilson's stream-of-conscious (such as on "Solar System") to adolescent concerns (such as "roller skating", schoolmate infatuations, and fraternizing with the family of one's girlfriend). Wilson went in this direction because he believed that these were the type of lyrics that fans had wanted from the Beach Boys.

Relative to 15 Big Ones, Wilson stated that he wanted Love You to be "more creative, more original" and "lyrically much more interesting." His 2016 memoir, I Am Brian Wilson, compared the lyrical approach to Pet Sounds. "I wrote some songs that were about how I felt in my thirties, the same way that Pet Sounds was about how I felt in my twenties." Mankey surmised, "Brian Wilson lyrics maybe weren't as familiar to the public as [his past co-written lyrics] were, and so The Beach Boys Love You songs might have seemed odder because no one knew what Brian was really like."

Carlin characterizes the total effect as having reframed the themes of past Beach Boys hits through Wilson's "warped" adult perspective, as well as "a tour through the cracked fun-house mirror of [his] imagination". Dillon acknowledged that, given the age of the band members, the fact that they "sing these teenage ditties made the tunes a little creepy". Stebbins felt that the album "revealed more than the listener wanted to know", containing songs with "unsettling, pedophilic overtone[s]" such as "Roller Skating Child" and "I Wanna Pick You Up". According to biographer Timothy White, it was a "portrait of a man trying to redefine his shattered personality."

Songs

Side one
"Let Us Go On This Way" is a rock song in which the narrator, a young man, expresses to his object of affection, "To get you babe, I went through the ringer / ain't gonna let you slip through my finger", followed by a plea for God to "let us go on this way". Wilson said he wrote the song with Mike Love when they found that the rest of the album sounded too "deadpan and we needed something uptempo". "Roller Skating Child" elaborates on the themes of the previous track except, as Carlin writes, "with a grown-up perspective that made it sound like a kind of musical interpretation of Vladimir Nabokov's novel Lolita, complete with vivid descriptions of adolescent sexuality... careless parenting [and] lust-fueled escape"." Wilson said the song was a tribute to his daughters Carnie and Wendy. "Carnie actually goes ice-skating but I called it 'Roller skating child, with a ribbon in her hair.' We all go out to a skating rink in Santa Monica."

"Mona" is a 1950s-style love song with only four chords. The lyrics discuss some of Wilson's favorite songs by Phil Spector, including his 1963 productions of the Crystals' "Da Doo Ron Ron" and the Ronettes' "Be My Baby". "Johnny Carson" similarly expresses admiration for the host of the late-night television talk show, The Tonight Show Starring Johnny Carson. Carlin refers to the track as the album's "pivot point", one that "separates the normal from the freakishly bizarre." Asked about the song in a 1979 interview, Carson answered, "Sure I heard it. Someone sent it over to the office. I don't think it was a big seller. I think they just did it for the fun of it. It was not a work of art."

"Good Time" is a song about a man who declares of his various girlfriends, "Maybe it won't last but what do we care / My baby and I just want a good time". It was first tracked by the band on January 7, 1970 at their since-dismantled private studio – predating the Love You sessions by seven years – and had already been released, albeit with different vocals, as the second single by American Spring from their debut album, Spring (1972).  Wilson explained that he recycled the song for Love You because Spring had sold poorly, and he thought, "Maybe the exposure to that song to people might be good. Why waste a song?" Since the recording of "Good Time", Wilson's voice had deteriorated significantly, making it the only track on Love You in which his singing is not coarse.

"Honkin' Down the Highway" is a rock and roll song about a man driving to a woman, at her father's behest, for an engagement that the narrator states will conclude with himself "Takin' one little inch at a time, now / 'Til we're feelin' fine, now". Wilson said, "I remember when I wrote that I was thinkin' 'truckin' down the highway' – just some kind of a country western kind of an idea. The actual song itself wasn't that country though." 

"Ding Dang" is a short song, consisting of a single verse and chorus, that Wilson wrote with the Byrds' Roger McGuinn in the early 1970s. McGuinn recalled that Wilson had one day visited his home asking for amphetamines. After they worked together on the song, McGuinn went to bed. The next morning, he found that Wilson was still awake playing "Ding Dang" on the piano. Only one lyric was ever written: "I love a girl and I love her madly / I treat her so fine but she treats me so badly". Jardine surmised that Wilson's longtime obsession with the folk standard "Shortenin' Bread" may have originated from this impromptu writing session for "Ding Dang".

Wilson recorded "Ding Dang" in the studio on numerous occasions during the mid-1970s. Mankey noted that "everybody who showed up [to the sessions] got subjected to 'Ding Dang'." It appeared on the album with a less than one-minute runtime, virtually unaltered from how Wilson and McGuinn originally left it.

Side two

"Solar System" discusses the planetary system in a similar vein as the band's 1965 hit "California Girls". In the song, the narrator asks, "What do the planets mean? / And have you ever seen / sunrise in the mornin'? / It shined when you were born". "The Night Was So Young", according to Carlin, revels in "traditional shades of self-pity, jealousy, and loneliness". It was written about Wilson's mistress, Debbie Keil, and her nightly visits to his home. Stebbins called it "a direct descendent of Pet Sounds in both sound and attitude." "I'll Bet He's Nice" follows similar themes as the previous track.

"Let's Put Our Hearts Together" is a duet between Wilson and his first wife Marilyn. In the song, they discuss the insecurities that they feel for each other before coming together to "see what we can cook up between us". Wilson said that he enlisted Marilyn as a vocalist because he had inadvertently composed the song in a key outside of his vocal range.

"I Wanna Pick You Up", in Carlin's description, concerns an "object of desire" that is "either a disturbingly sexualized infant or a dismayingly infantilized adult." At the end of the song, the singer instructs the listener to "pat, pat, pat her on her butt, butt / She's gone to sleep, be quiet". Wilson explained that the lyrics are about "a man who considers this chick a baby.... she's too big to pick up, of course. But he wants to; he wants to pretend she's small like a baby: He really wants to pick her up!"

"Airplane" is a love song written from the perspective of someone flying on an airplane. "Love Is a Woman" concludes the album with an instrumental palette of saxophones and flutes. Wilson wrote of the song, "It's just about everybody, about anything, about how things are. It's an idea that a woman is love. A baby is love, too, of course. It's just an experience, you know? 'Love is a Baby' would have been a better title."

Leftover
Several songs that were recorded or worked on during the Love You sessions were passed over for inclusion on the album. Among these were the originals "11th Bar Blues", "Clangin'", "Hey Little Tomboy", "Lazy Lizzie", "Sherry She Needs Me", "Marilyn Rovell", "My Diane", "Hey There Momma", and "We Gotta Groove", as well as "That Special Feeling".  "Sherry She Needs Me" dated from the band's Summer Days (and Summer Nights!!) era, with Wilson overdubbing a new lead vocal onto the backing track from 1965. "Lazy Lizzie" includes a melody recycled from Wilson's Mount Vernon and Fairway (1973). Biographer David Leaf referred to the song as "a fully realized production as well as a strong example of Brian's songwriting ability."

In addition, Wilson worked on cover versions of the Drifters' "Ruby Baby" and the Righteous Brothers' "You've Lost That Lovin' Feelin'". According to band archivist Alan Boyd, "His [Wilson's] version of 'You've Lost that Lovin’ Feeling' is very dark and it's very raw. It almost has kind of a punk edge to it.... He plays everything on it, did all the vocals. Everything was pretty much done in one take."

"Hey Little Tomboy" and "My Diane" were completed for M.I.U. Album (1978). "Hey There Momma" was reworked into "I Saw Santa (Rockin' Around the Christmas Tree)"; the reworking was released on the 1998 compilation Ultimate Christmas. "Sherry She Needs Me" and "You've Lost That Lovin' Feelin'" were released on the box set Made in California (2013). "11th Bar Blues", "Clangin'", "Lazy Lizzie", "Marilyn Rovell", "We Gotta Groove", "That Special Feeling", and "Hey There Momma" remain unreleased.

Title and packaging
Wilson originally intended to title the album Brian Loves You, with the "you" referring to the group's fanbase. He said that he chose the name Love You  because he "thought it would be a good sound people could feel secure with". To make the album seem more democratic, its title was changed to The Beach Boys Love You. Reflective of the new title, the inner sleeve included a dedication to Wilson from his bandmates, "To Brian, whom we love with all our hearts...", written below a photo of him at a party with Marilyn. Jardine later commented, "The title of that album is really The Beach Boys Love Brian." The dedication continues,

 
Dean Torrence designed the cover illustration, which was intended to resemble a Navajo rug, and had suggested titling the album Cowabunga, inspired by Chief Thunderball's catch-phrase on the children's television show Howdy Doody. According to Dillon, the cover "inadvertently suggests a Lite-Brite toy, which suits the childlike wonder of the record's contents."

Jardine had an unfavorable opinion of the design: "[I]t's a shame that the [Love You] album cover is so crummy. Everything about that thing is home made. I think they [Warner Bros.] thought it was our last album. They didn't spend a penny on the album because they knew that we weren't coming back. They used real cheap cardboard on it." Torrence contended that expensive paper was used to simulate the record sleeve's stitched texture.

Release

On November 27, 1976, Wilson appeared as the featured musical guest on NBC's Saturday Night, during which he performed "Love Is a Woman", "Back Home", and "Good Vibrations". It was his first solo television appearance since 1967's Inside Pop: The Rock Revolution. Producer Lorne Michaels insisted that Wilson appear without his bandmates, who were playing their third night of sold-out concerts at nearby Madison Square Garden. Another solo appearance on The Mike Douglas Show, which included an interview with Wilson about his past drug use, was filmed days earlier, but was not broadcast until December 8. In early December, Landy was relieved from his services amid concerns of his raising fees and controversial treatment methods. On December 31, the band played a fifteenth anniversary celebration concert at the Los Angeles Forum, a performance that included "Airplane". 

By 1977, the media hype ahead of the "Brian's Back" campaign from the previous year had dissipated. As Love You approached completion, band manager Stephen Love arranged negotiations for the band to change labels with CBS Records once the group had fulfilled their contractual obligations to Warner Bros. Gaines writes, "Warner Brothers knew of the CBS deal by January 1977... Warner was so disgusted with the Beach Boys at this point that the group members were convinced the company was doing very little to promote the album." Released on April 11, Love You reached number 53 in the U.S. during a seven-week chart stay. One single, "Honkin' Down the Highway", was issued several weeks later with no chart showing.

Members of the group, including Mike Love, attributed the album's poor sales to Warner's lackluster promotional efforts. Gaines countered that, despite what the group thought of the company, "the best promotional campaign in the world couldn't have helped The Beach Boys Love You".

Critical reception

Contemporary

Love You was met with polarized reactions from the public. Schinder cited a "sharp divide" between fans and critics, some of whom saw the album as a work of "eccentric genius" whereas others "dismissed it as childish and trivial". Some listeners viewed the album as a near-punk rock statement and felt that it had been a refreshing change of pace given the dominance of progressive rock and "overproduced" pop that had dominated the mainstream for several years. Generally, the reactions from record reviewers were positive. Writing in his 1978 biography of the band, John Tobler said that Love You was "in the author's estimation and that of several critics... the best released by the group since the '60s."

Favorable reviews were penned by numerous esteemed critics, including Circus Lester Bangs, Creems Mitchell Cohen, NMEs Nick Kent, The Village Voices Robert Christgau, and Rolling Stones Billy Altman. Bangs said it was the Beach Boys' "best album ever" and described them affectionately as a "diseased bunch of motherfuckers" who exhibit "a beauty so awesome that listening to them at their best is like being in some vast dream cathedral decorated with a thousand gleaming American pop culture icons." Altham's review stated that the album was "flawed but enjoyable. Brian Wilson still isn't singing as well as he used to, but his playing and composing talents have certainly returned from wherever they've been the past few years." Patti Smith, known as the "godmother of punk", contributed a review in Hit Parader that was written in the form of a poem. Melody Makers reviewer decreed, "This album can appear insubstantial on early acquaintance, but further attention yields many riches."

Casual listeners generally found the album's idiosyncrasies to be a detriment, while some of the group's fans considered the rough vocals and production distracting. Peter Ames Carlin, then a junior high school student who had eagerly anticipated the album's release, recalled of his reaction, "This was his big return — all original songs; a complete Brian production. And you listen to it and you were like, What the hell is this?' It's so different." Wilson himself reviewed the album in the May 1977 issue of Crawdaddy!. His conclusions: "I like the new album better than the last one... It's a cleaner album; the tracks and the songs seem to come off cleaner."

One of the few negative reviews of the album, written by Michael Tearson, was published in David Leaf's fanzine Pet Sounds. In another negative review, by a writer for Audio, the album was named "a real disappointment... patronizing and disastrous, the kind of record to get out of a contract with. And that they have done." The writer accused other critics of writing inauthentic positive feedback toward the album, and praised Tearson for being "the only record reviewer who told it like it is. It took guts."

Retrospective

In the decades since its release, Love You has remained divisive among fans. It has developed a cult following, and it is regarded by some as one of the band's best albums. Writing in his 2017 book The Words and Music of Brian Wilson, Christian Matijas-Mecca called it "extraordinary in its sheer originality and its rejection of contemporary trends in popular music", likening it to "the Smiley Smile of 1977". Matijas-Mecca added that Love You was "the most unexpected album" of 1977 and unlike anything else released that year, concluding that it "remains as surprising and refreshing today as it did upon its original release." AllMusic reviewer John Bush praised the album and believed that "The Night Was So Young," "I'll Bet He's Nice," and "Let's Put Our Hearts Together" form a suite during side two that possesses a breadth of emotional attachment to rival Pet Sounds.

Musician magazine's Geoffrey Himes wrote in 1981: "In the bargain bins [the album] collected dust. That 1977 release is Brian Wilson's most ambitious and successful work of the decade. It ranks with Fleetwood Mac's Tusk, Steely Dan's Katy Lied, and Neil Young's Zuma as the best California rock albums of the decade." Referring to "naysayers" of Love You, the underground fanzine Scram wrote "fuck [them]... [the album showcases] a truly original mix of humor and sadness. The original numbers always dance just a step away from the cliché, dealing with simple lyrical themes that make you wonder why they had never been explored before." The A.V. Clubs Keith Phipps relented: "there's something not-quite-right about men on the cusp of middle age hungering after a 'roller-skating child'—but its failure reveals a touching vulnerability beneath the sunny good-times image of an American institution", going on to say that "more often than not, Love You has a winning, human directness."

Aftermath and legacy

The recording of Love You remained the last time Brian Wilson took charge of a Beach Boys album. Pitchforks D. Erik Kempke said that it "stands in sharp contrast to the albums that preceded and followed it, because it was a product of genuine inspiration on Brian Wilson's part, with little outside interference." Carlin noted that, following Love You, Wilson would not write songs that reflected his musical, emotional, and intellectual interests to a similar degree until the aborted Andy Paley sessions from the 1990s. Matijas-Mecca characterized Wilson, embittered by the band's lack of support for his new music, as choosing "the path of least, or no, resistance when working with the Beach Boys" for the next several decades.

Among the band members, Brian later referred to it as his favorite Beach Boys album on repeated occasions, explaining in a 1998 interview, "That's when it all happened for me. That's where my heart lies. Love You, Jesus, that's the best album we ever made." In a 2000 interview, he said, "My favorites are 'I Wanna Pick You Up' and 'Ding Dang'.... One of the shortest records we have ever made." Asked in 2009 for the records in his catalog that he felt had been underrated, he listed Love You and the tracks "Ding Dang", "Johnny Carson", "The Night Was So Young", and "I'll Bet He's Nice". Mike Love commented in his 2016 memoir that the album was "undeniably original but fragmented and just plain odd". In a 2013 interview, Al Jardine expressed enthusiasm for performing the entire Love You album in concert, going on to note, "those are some of the best songs we ever did."

Influence and other musicians
According to Dillon, Love You is considered to have influenced the development of new wave, while Clay Patrick McBride of The Washington Post wrote that Wilson "helped invent synth-pop" with the album. Journalist Adam Theisan wrote that the album's "prescience" is one of its striking elements, having anticipated "new wave experiments, arty bands like Talking Heads and synth-pop in general years before they hit the mainstream." Wilson remarked in a 2000 interview, "It's funny because now people are beginning to see that album as a classic – it was quite revolutionary in its use of synthesizers." 

Thurston Moore of Sonic Youth first discovered the Beach Boys through Patti Smith's review of Love You. R.E.M.'s Peter Buck praised the record as "a window into the heart of one of the greatest composers of the twentieth century." He named it his favorite Beach Boys album.  Producer Alan Boyd opined, "It's a fascinating record. I've never heard a record before or since that sounded like it. It's got its own sonic texture that no one has ever tried to do before.... Some of those songs and chord progressions are among the richest and the deepest that Brian ever did."

Alex Chilton recorded a cover of "Solar System" that was included on his Electricity by Candlelight (2013), and he contributed his version of "I Wanna Pick You Up" to the multi-artist tribute album Caroline Now! (2000). Other songs covered in the compilation were "Honkin' Down the Highway" (Radio Sweethearts), "Good Time" (Stevie Jackson of Belle and Sebastian), and "Let's Put Our Hearts Together" (duet between Chip Taylor and Evie Sands). In 1997, Darian Sahanaja released a cover of "I Wanna Pick You Up" as a single.  Yo La Tengo's live rendition of "Ding Dang" was released on the 2006 compilation Yo La Tengo Is Murdering the Classics.

Track listing

Personnel
Adapted from 2000 CD liner notes.

The Beach Boys
 Al Jardine
 Mike Love
 Brian Wilson
 Carl Wilson
 Dennis Wilson

Technical and production staff
 Stephen Desper – engineer on "Good Time"
 Stephen Moffitt – engineer
 Earle Mankey – engineer
 Dean Torrence – cover design
 Guy Webster – photography

Charts

Notes

References

Bibliography

External links
 
 The Beach Boys Love You on YouTube (playlist)
  (documentary excerpt)
 

Reprise Records albums
The Beach Boys albums
Albums produced by Brian Wilson
Synth-pop albums by American artists
1977 albums